Mohammed Habedat Saddiq is Lord-lieutenant of Somerset.  A utilities-sector engineer and manager he was born in Leeds, Yorkshire in June 1970 after his parents came to England in the late 1960s from Pakistan.

Career 
He has held management and engineering positions in the water, waste and renewables sectors, including as founder of green energy business GENeco and director of Swiss Combi Technology.

In 2020 he was awarded an honorary doctorate from the University of the West of England for enhancing the sustainable development of Bristol.

Saddiq was appointed as Lord-lieutenant of Somerset with effect from 29 October 2022, taking over from Mrs Annie Maw CVO who retired after eight years in the role.

Personal life 
He is married to Paula with whom he has five children.  He lives in Midford, Somerset.

References 

1970 births
Living people
English people of Pakistani descent